Agelanthus kayseri is a species of hemiparasitic plant in the family Loranthaceae, which is native to Kenya, Tanzania and Somalia.

Description 
A description of the plant is given in Govaerts et al.

Habitat/ecology
A. kayseri is found in coastal bushland and mangrove stands, extending inland along rivers, commonly on Dobera, Salvadora or mangroves, based on Polhill & Wiens.

References

Flora of Tanzania
Flora of Kenya
Flora of Somalia
kayseri